Sud-Vest Oltenia (English South-West Oltenia) is a development region in Romania. As the other development regions, it does not have any administrative powers, its main function being to co-ordinate regional development projects and manage funds from the European Union.

Sud-Vest Development Region is roughly coterminous with the historic region of Oltenia (82,4%), and for that reason it is sometimes called Regiunea de dezvoltare Sud-Vest Oltenia. The Danube forms the natural boundary  between Romania and Serbia to the southwest, and Bulgaria to the south.

Counties
The Sud-Vest region is made up of the following counties:
Dolj
Gorj
Mehedinți
Olt
Vâlcea

See also
Development regions of Romania
Nomenclature of Territorial Units for Statistics

References

 

Development regions of Romania